Miss Diva 2021 was the 9th edition of the Miss Diva beauty pageant which was held on 30 September 2021 in Hyatt Regency Hotel, Mumbai. The 20 shortlisted contestants from all over the country competed in the pageant. Adline Castelino crowned Harnaaz Sandhu as her successor. After three months, she represented India at Miss Universe 2021 and became the 3rd Miss Universe from India to win the crown. Aavriti Choudhary crowned Ritika Khatnani as her successor. She represented India at Miss Supranational 2022 and won the title of Miss Supranational Asia 2022. Neha Jaiswal crowned Sonal Kukreja as 1st Runner-Up, whereas Kriti Sanon sashed all the remaining Runners-Up. Divita Rai was selected to represent India at Miss Universe 2022 and was placed in top 16. She was the only Asian contestant placed based on the judges' decision.

This edition marked the longest period of time (20 months after Miss Diva 2020) that the organization has taken to hold an annual contest in contrast to its previous editions.

Final results
Color keys

Sub-contests

Miss Beach Body

Miss Beautiful Hair

Miss Beautiful Skin

Miss Beautiful Smile

Miss Fashion Icon

Miss Photogenic

Miss Talented

Other Sub-Contest Winners

Format

The pioneer 
For the first time in Miss Diva's history, the Organization has lowered the height criteria from 5'5 "to 5'4". The organization now also allows transwomen to enter the pageant meeting the criteria in certain.
Dipanjali Chhetri became the first trans woman to compete in the Miss Diva competition. She made it to the top 50 semifinalists.

Selection of candidates 
In light of the pandemic situation that has paralyzed the nation, the Miss Diva Organization made the conscious decision to follow the digital course and limit its operations to virtual projection and online interviews, thus presenting a propitious opportunity for applicants participate from the comfort of their homes. The Organization opened the application to the public on June 11, 2021, until July 20, 2021.

After the initial auditions, applicants are shortlisted to a Top 50 list, and these candidates were summoned for several rounds of interviews, chaired by an elite bench of celebrities. Later, the selected contestants shortened down to top 20 finalists, including a wild card entry, chosen by public vote. These 20 finalists took part of the contest's boot-camp and will compete in the final event to be held in Mumbai on 30 September 2021.

Contestants

Top 20 
The following are the 20 official contestants:
Color key

Semifinalists 
As in the previous edition, the winner of the Campus Princess contest will obtain a direct place in the Top 20 of Miss Diva 2021. Below are the Top 18 finalists of Campus Princess 2020. The list of finalists was announced in two parts, Part I and Part II on July 24 and 25, 2021 respectively. Miss Diva 2021 Top 50 was announced on 16 August 2021.

On August 23, 2021, the Top 20 and Top 5 Wild Card aspirants were announced. The top 5 wild card contenders will face a public online vote until August 30, 2021, and the one with the most votes will enter the Top 20.

Judges

Final night
 Shivan Bhatia - Fashion designer
 Narresh Kukreja - Fashion designer
 Ashwiny Iyer Tiwari - Filmmaker, writer and author
 Kriti Sanon - Actress
 Pankaj Advani - Billiards and snooker player
 Kanika Kapoor - Singer
 Angad Bedi - Actor

For Top 20 finalists
 Srishti Sawhney - President & Global brand director, Pulp & Fibre Business - Aditya Birla Group
 Natasha Grover - National Director, Brand & Operation Head - Miss India Organization
 Sushant Divgikar - Mister Gay India 2014, Performing artist, Drag Icon, Singer, Equal rights champion & Motivational speaker
 Bhawna Rao - Designer
 Abhishek Sharma - Designer
 Saisha Shinde - Designer
 Rani Mol - Head, Times Talent
 Supreet Bedi - TV Anchor, Celebrity host
 Bharat Gupta - Fashion consultant, creative director, and stylist
 Noyonita Lodh - Miss Diva 2014
 Neha Jaiswal - Miss Diva 2020 Runner-up

For Top 50 semifinalists
The following eight judges determined the 50 semifinalists.
 Bharat Gupta - Fashion consultant, creative director, and stylist
 Srinidhi Shetty - Miss Supranational 2016
 Bianca Louzado - Hair and makeup expert
 Neha Jaiswal - Miss Diva 2020 Runner-up
 Jitesh Thakur - Mister Supranational 2016 2nd Runner-up
 Noyonita Lodh - Miss Diva 2014
 Sushant Divgikar - Performing artist, singer, equal rights champion, and motivational speaker
 Shefali Sood - Miss Diva Supranational 2019

Crossovers & Returnees
Contestants who previously competed in previous editions of Liva Miss Diva and other local and international beauty pageants with their respective placements.

National Pageants 
Miss Diva
 2015: Naveli Deshmukh (2nd Runner Up)
 2018: Aishwarya Kamal
 2022: Divita Rai (Miss Universe India)
 2022: Ojasvi Sharma (Miss Popular Choice)
Femina Miss India
 2015: Naveli Deshmukh (Top 10)
 2019: Harnaaz Sandhu (Top 12)
 2019: Siddhi Gupta (Top 12)
Miss Teen India
 2018: Ritika Khatnani (Winner)

International Pageants 
Miss Teen International
 2018: Ritika Khatnani (1st Runner Up)

Notes

Replacements

References 

2021 beauty pageants
2021 in India
Miss Diva